Little Figures is the first full-length LP by Athens, Georgia's The Method Actors.  The album was first released as a 17 track double LP by UK label Armageddon Records in 1981.  It was released as a single, 10-track LP on the US label Press Records the following year.

Track listing (2 x LP)
"Strictly Gossip"
"Repetition"
"I'm in the Mood for Love"
"Notice"
"Rang-a-Tang"
"Bleeding"
"Ask Dana"
"20x1"
"Commotion"
"E-Y-E"
"Cats and Dogs"
"Pigeons"
"Halloween"
"Detective"
"Alcohol"
"Somebody's Prison"
"Hi-Hi Whoopee"

The Method Actors albums
1981 albums